First Presbyterian Church is a historic Presbyterian church building at 410 NW 2nd Street in Mineral Wells, Texas.

The Classical Revival building was constructed in 1909 and added to the National Register of Historic Places in 1979. The structure was demolished sometime in the 1980s and replaced.

See also

National Register of Historic Places listings in Palo Pinto County, Texas

References

Presbyterian churches in Texas
Churches on the National Register of Historic Places in Texas
Neoclassical architecture in Texas
Churches completed in 1909
20th-century Presbyterian church buildings in the United States
Buildings and structures in Palo Pinto County, Texas
National Register of Historic Places in Palo Pinto County, Texas
Neoclassical church buildings in the United States